The  is a tolled expressway that connects Hyōgo and Tokushima prefectures in Japan by crossings of the Akashi Strait and Naruto Strait. Built between 1970 and 1998, it is one of the three routes of the Honshu-Shikoku Bridge Expressway Company connecting Honshū and Shikoku islands. The route is signed E28 under Ministry of Land, Infrastructure, Transport and Tourism's  "2016 Proposal for Realization of Expressway Numbering."

Route description

The expressway has four lanes along the entire route from Kobe to Naruto in Tokushima, with an exception along the Akashi Kaikyō Bridge, were it has six lanes. 
The speed limit is 70 km/h between Awajishima-minami Interchange and Naruto-kita Interchange, 100 km/h between Awaji Interchange and Seidan-Mihara  Interchange as well as between Kobe-Nishi Interchange and Tarumi Junction. The remainder of the expressway has a speed limit set at 80 km/h.

History
On 8 June 1985 the first sections of the expressway opened. These were between Tsuna-Ichinomiya Interchange and Sumoto Interchange and between Naruto-kita Interchange and the now defunct Seidan Interchange. The latter of the two sections includes the Ōnaruto Bridge. On 23 May 1987, the road was extended south from Naruto-kita Interchange to its southern terminus at Naruto Interchange. Next, on 8 October 1987, the highway between Sumoto IC and Seidan-Mihara Interchange was opened. The opening of Seidan-Mihara Interchange necessitated the closure of Seidan Interchange. On 5 April 1998 the highway between Kobe-Nishi Interchange and Tsuna-Ichinomiya Interchange was opened with the completion of the Akashi Kaikyō Bridge.  The most recent development on the expressway came on 17 February 2018, when the ETC-only Awajishima-chuo Smart Interchange was opened.

Junction list
TB= Toll booth, SA= Service Area, PA= Parking Area

|colspan="8" style="text-align: center;"|Through to  San'yō Expressway

|colspan="8" style="text-align: center;"|Through to  /

See also

Japan National Route 28

References

External links

Honshu-Shikoku Bridge Expressway Company Limited: E28 KOBE-AWAJI-NARUTO EXPWY

Expressways in Japan
Roads in Hyōgo Prefecture
Roads in Tokushima Prefecture